Theodore Saloutos (August 3, 1910 – November 15, 1980) was an American historian. His areas of research included agrarian politics and reform movements, immigration studies, and Greek immigration to the United States

Early life 
Saloutos was born in Milwaukie, Wisconsin on August 3, 1910. His parents were immigrants from Greece.

Education 

Saloutos was awarded a BA in 1933 from Milwaukee State Teacher’s College. He took a Ph.D. in history from the University of Wisconsin.

Employment
Early in his career Saloutos taught at Oberlin College.

In 1945 he gained a post as lecturer in the Department of History at the University of California, Los Angeles, becoming a full professor in 1955. He stayed there until his retirement.

Between 1965-1966 he was president of the Agriculture History Society. In 1973 he was elected president of the Immigration History Society.

Selected publications

 (1951) Agricultural Discontent in the Middle West, 1900-1939
 (1964) The Greeks of the United States
 (1968) Populism: Reaction or Reform?
 (1982) The American Farmer and the New Deal

References

External links 

 Theodore Saloutos papers at the Immigration History Research Center Archives, University of Minnesota Libraries.

Writers from California
Writers from Wisconsin
University of Wisconsin–Madison College of Letters and Science alumni
1910 births
1980 deaths
University of California, Los Angeles faculty
20th-century American historians
American male non-fiction writers
Historians from California
20th-century American male writers